The Baden-Powell Award, also known as the B-P Award or Baden-Powell Scout Award (BPSA), is the highest award achievable to Rover (adult) Scouts. 

Although it has become a less common award as some Scout Associations no longer offer a Rover program, it is still awarded in several countries, including Australia, Brazil, Guatemala, Hong Kong, Malaysia, Singapore, South Africa, New Zealand, and in Traditional Scouting organizations in the United Kingdom and the United States.

Youth Girl Guides in Australia also have two awards named after Robert Baden-Powell, the Junior BP Award and BP Award, although neither is the highest award possible.  The Baden Powell Challenge Award was the ultimate award for Guides in the United Kingdom until it was retired in the spring of 2019.

Australia

Scouting
Prior to 2014, members of Rovers (Australia) were able to earn the Baden-Powell Scout Award through either of two methods, after completing their Rover Skills Badge, outlined below;

Method A
Method A is the more popular version of the Baden-Powell Scout Award, also known as the "Traditional" Method, as it is more clearly defined with targets for its badges.

Method B
Method B includes the Spiritual Development, Intellectual & Emotional Development, Social Development and Physical Development Badges.

New Baden-Powell Scout Award

At the start of 2014, a new version of the Baden-Powell Scout Award was introduced. All Rovers who had already started the old version of the award (Method A or Method B) were given the choice to either continue with the old award or transfer their completed badges to the new award scheme. The new Baden-Powell Scout Award is broken up into two levels: the St. George Award and the Baden-Powell Scout Award.

The St. George Award is made up of four badges: Squire Training, Rover Skills, Service and Physical. A Rover must complete the Squire Training badge before they can start any other badge, but most Rover Crews will have their new Rovers (Squires) complete this badge before they are fully invested into the Rover Crew.

The Baden-Powell Scout Award involves the completion of four components: the St. George Award, the Community Development badge, the Personal Growth badge and the Self-Reflection Interview.

Guiding
In Girl Guides, participants have the option of completing two different versions of the award, the Junior BP and the BP. Both awards involve the completion of activities (chosen by the guide) in the following categories: Promise and Law, Outdoors, Patrol System, Service, World Guiding and Guiding traditions. In the Junior BP, Guides must complete a total of 12 activities, in the BP they must complete 18. In both awards, the Guide receives an Endeavor badge when they are halfway through.  The Junior BP is not a prerequisite for earning the BP.

The Junior BP and BP both serve as preparation for the Queen's Guide Award, which is the highest award a Guide can achieve, but it is not essential to complete either to earn Queen's Guide.

Canada

Baden-Powell Service Association
Canada's Baden-Powell Service Association does not have a centralized BPSA Body.  Traditional Scouting programs are run by independent Provincial Associations in British Columbia, Alberta, Ontario and New Brunswick, each of which uses the B-P Award as its highest Rover award.

Hong Kong

Scout Association of Hong Kong
Baden Powell Award continues the training progress of the Rover Scout Award. Self planning and managing are prerequisite to achieve this highest award. During the course from planning to operation, Rovers could equip themselves with a positive value of living, learning Scout knowledge, technique and attitude.

The topics of Baden Powell Award are same as the Rover Scout Award in which Service, Scoutcraft and Exploration are compulsory, whilst Scout Knowledge, Self-development, Interpersonal Skills, Personal Pursuit and Look Wide are optional. Rovers are required to take 3 amongst the 5 options for assessment.

The assessment of the Baden Powell Award is arranged by the RHQC (RS). Certificate and award will be issued when confirmed and approved by AHQ after the recommendation of Regional Commissioner and District Commissioner.

Malaysia

Scouts Association of Malaysia
Baden-Powell Award (Malay: Anugerah Baden-Powell) or better known as B-P Award (Malay: Anugerah B-P) is the highest award of the Scouts Association of Malaysia (PPM) for a rover scout. To get this award, a rover scout must complete the rover scout training scheme. The conditions for obtaining this award are as follows:

1. Pass the rover scout badges, namely 3 compulsory badges (adventure badge, skills badge and service badge) and 1 optional badges (entrepreneurship badge, extreme badge, ICT badge, leadership badge, or life saver badge) respectively.

2. The rover scout that undergo the B-P Award's test must be between 18 to 25 years old only.

3. The B-P Award's nomination form will be provided by the Scouts Association of Malaysia's headquarters.

4. The rover scout must undergo the eligibility test (The B-P Award's Test Camp).

5. The B-P Award's certificate will be issued by the Scouts Association of Malaysia's headquarters.

New Zealand
The Baden Powell Award is a peer recognition Award, not a badge that can be earned on the completion of a set of criteria.
The Rover Crew, in consultation with the Regional Rover Leader, awards the Baden Powell Award for a member which:
 Is a continuously active and useful Crew member, having organised and co-ordinated projects and activities which ideally emphasise the aims of the Rover Section, of service to Scouting, the community and personal development.
 Sets a personal example of the Scout way of life, and living by the Scout Law and Promise.
 Has given outstanding and extensive service as a member of a Rover Crew.
 Has held a position of responsibility outside the Rover Crew on Scouting or another community organisation for a period of at least two years.
 Has been a member of a Rover Crew for a minimum period of three years.

South Africa

Scouts South Africa
The BP Award is the highest Scouting award available to Rovers in South Africa. It is designed to challenge and test all who set out to achieve this prestigious Award and takes into consideration the aim of Scouting, to encourage the Physical, Intellectual, Emotional, Social and Spiritual Character Development of youth.

Similar to other awards, the BP Award allows for the highest standard to be set. This occurs through the individual participant planning and proposing their goals to their Rover Crew. Through consultation and discussion at this level a target is set that is of a level that is guaranteed to be challenging and that meets the requirements of the BP Award.

In achieving this award, a Rover will set an example of the Scout way of life, carrying out the Rover Motto of 'Service'. The badge is worn on the left sleeve.

To achieve the BP Award a Rover needs to complete the following:
 Attain the four Advancement Bars.
 Attain four Rover Awards.
 Attain at least one of the Rover Challenge Awards.
 Attend a panel interview with the Regional Commissioner or their nominee to confirm that the Promise and Law have been adopted as a way of life and discuss the personal development that has occurred by means of the Rover Programme.

United Kingdom

The Scout Association
The Scout Association no longer operate a Rover Scout section, having abolished the section in 1964, and they no longer offer the Baden-Powell Award.

Baden-Powell Scouts Association
The Baden-Powell Award is available to invested Rovers of the Baden-Powell Scouts' Association.  The BPSA requirements for the award are similar to the "Traditional" option used by Rovers Australia.  The Rover must hold the Scoutcraft Star, Service Training Star, Rover Rambler's Badge and Rover Project Badge.  They are also required to show that they have been setting a personal example of the "Scout Way of Life" and to complete an interview with the Chief Commissioner of the Baden-Powell Scouts’ Association.

Girlguiding
The Baden-Powell Challenge Award was the highest a Guide could attain, until the award was retired in 2019.

United States

Baden-Powell Service Association
The Baden Powell Award is the highest award a Rover Knight can achieve in the Baden Powell Service Association.  It has similar requirements as the Baden-Powell Scouts Association and Rovers Australia; Rover Scouts must earn their Rambler's Badge, Scoutcraft Star, Project Badge and Service Training Star.  They must also receive a recommendation from their Rover Crew, Rover Crew Leader, and Group Scoutmaster, and complete an interview with the Association's Chief Commissioner.

See also
Scouts Australia
Scouts South Africa
Baden-Powell Scouts' Association
Rover Scouts
Scouts New Zealand
Girlguiding UK

References

External links
Rovers Australia - National Rover Council
www.nswrovers.com - Rovers in New South Wales
Victorian Rovers - events,properties,training,service,resources,crews
Rover Scouts Association - international Rovering fellowship
SA Rovers
SCOUTS New Zealand

Baden-Powell Scouts' Association
The Scout Association
Scouting and Guiding in Australia
Scout and Guide awards
Girlguiding